Desmalvinización (Spanish, translated as de-malvinisation) is a concept in Argentine society and politics that appeared after the defeat of the Falklands War in 1982, whereby the media refrained from mentioning the war and returning soldiers were almost ignored.  It contrasts with the nationalistic, anti-British fervour that proceeded and accompanied the war, encouraged by the military junta that ruled Argentina at the time. 

The des-malvinisation rhetoric stripped every heroic act committed on the islands and the conflict was taken as a "product of the dictatorship". For this, Argentine nationalism was rapidly dissolved after the war and taken as shameful. Those who consider the war as a patriotic cause or as an anticolonial struggle, was seen as a dictatorship apologist.

It gets its name from the Spanish denomination for the islands: Islas Malvinas.

Re-malvinización
In the years leading up to the thirtieth anniversary of the war in 2012, the Argentine society and media started to renew the claim of the nationalist Falklands cause. This is known as "re-malvinización". As part of this, president Cristina Fernández de Kirchner has criticised the earlier desmalvinización and pledged to make the islands' ownership a central plank of her presidency. 

Some commentators have said that re-malvinización is designed merely to "distract people from domestic discontents" and to attract new potential voters bringing up a national cause, rather like the original war justification of the leader of the junta, Leopoldo Galtieri, that he intended to make up for the junta's plummeting popularity invading the islands.

References

Aftermath of the Falklands War
Political terminology